Brembo S.p.A. is an Italian manufacturer of automotive brake systems, especially for high-performance cars and motorcycles. Its head office is in Curno, Bergamo, Italy.

History
Brembo was established in Paladina, Italy, on January 11, 1961, by Emilio Bombassei and Italo Breda (father and uncle, respectively, to the current Chairman Alberto Bombassei).  The company was named after the Brembo river, as Bombassei lived in a village on the coast of the river before moving to Milan. Soon after Brembo was formed, it specialized in disc brakes, which were imported from the UK at the time. The company entered into a supply contract with Alfa Romeo in 1964 and became Moto Guzzi's brake component supplier in 1966. In the 1980s, Brembo also began supplying brakes to BMW, Chrysler, Ferrari, Mercedes-Benz, Nissan, and Porsche. Brembo went public on the Milan Stock Exchange in 1995.

In 2000, Brembo purchased the UK-based racing brake and clutch manufacturer AP Racing (a former division of Automotive Products). On November 9, 2007, Brembo's North American subsidiary acquired the Automotive Brake Components division of Hayes Lemmerz. The approximately €39.6-million sale included approximately 250 employees and production facilities in Homer, Michigan and Apodaca, Mexico.

An official press release on May 21, 2014, announced an €83-million expansion of the Michigan facility. Later that year, on December 2, Brembo also announced plans to invest €32 million into a 31,500-square-meter production facility, projected to produce two million aluminum calipers annually. The expectation was initial operation by 2016 and full operation by the end of 2018.

On March 5, 2015, Brembo's deputy chairman, Matteo Tiraboschi, reported the company's 2014 sales growth of 15% up to €1.8 billion and a net profit increase of 45% to €129.1 million. He also reported the company was exploring acquiring assets, with a focus on the automotive and aviation sectors.

The company's corporate headquarters are in Stezzano, and the company has more than 10,634 employees within Italy and at branches in Brazil, China, Japan, Mexico, the US, Poland, Spain, Sweden, and the UK. As of 2019, Brembo was present in 14 countries worldwide.

Products

Brembo specializes in performance braking systems and components as well as conducting research on braking systems. Brembo sells over 1,300 products worldwide and is known for their aftermarket automotive brake components, including calipers, drums, rotors, and brake lines. Brembo owns the foundries that produce their initial materials and supply the manufacturing plants. In all other markets, the company controls the entire production system—from raw materials through distribution. The company holds QS9000 and ISO 9001 certifications.

Motorsport
A variety of Formula One teams, including Ferrari, use Brembo brakes. Brembo also supplies the majority of MotoGP teams; the Gresini squad used Nissin brakes during the 2014 season. Brembo was also an official brake supplier for the IndyCar Series from the 2012 season until the 2016 season; during the 2017 season, Brembo supplied calipers only. During the next season, Brembo supplied entire braking systems to all Spark Racing Technology Gen2 cars in Formula E.

Since 2005, Brembo has been an official brake caliper supplier for the GP2 Series and the FIA Formula 2 Championship. Since 2010, Brembo has been an official whole brake supplier for the GP3 Series and the FIA Formula 3 Championship. Brembo is the exclusive supplier of braking systems for the MotoE World Cup.

AP Racing brakes are currently used on GT500-class cars in the Super GT series as well as cars competing in the DTM. Brembo is the official brake supplier for the Supercars Championship.

Brembo Group brands

 AP — Car brakes
 AP Racing — Racing motorcycle and car clutches and brakes
 Breco — Aftermarket discs and drums
 Brembo — High end brakes
 ByBre — Small to midsize scooter and motorcycle brakes in Brazil, Russia, India, China, and South East Asia
Marchesini — Wheels
 Villar — Aftermarket discs
 SBS Friction — OEM and aftermarket brake pads, brake discs and clutch kits for motorcycles, scooter, racing and UTVs/SSVs/ATVs

See also 

List of Italian companies

References

External links

Auto parts suppliers of Italy
Manufacturing companies established in 1961
Companies listed on the Borsa Italiana
Automotive motorsports and performance companies
Italian companies established in 1961
Italian brands
Companies based in Bergamo
Motorcycle parts manufacturers
Multinational companies headquartered in Italy
Brakes
1995 initial public offerings